Middlesex 9s (also known as the Mx9s) is a rugby league nines tournament that is hosted by the London Skolars rugby league club at their New River Stadium in North London, and held in August.

The Middlesex 9s was a concept formulated between the Federation of Middlesex Sports and the London Skolars based along similar lines as the rugby union sevens tournament; the Middlesex 7s.

The tournament brings together teams from abroad, amateur, student and the armed forces. The aims are to aid the development of rugby league. It is unusual in allowing rugby union clubs to take part in a rugby league competition.

The 2006 competition was expanded to involve mainly international teams from the developing nations, and held in conjunction with the Challenge Cup final after its relocation back to London. This event included the largest number of international rugby league teams to be in the UK since the last World Cup.

The 2007 tournament featured national amateur teams from eight nations plus a European Federation select side, GB Students, a London origin team and the Army.

Winners

See also

References

External links
French Invasion for Friday Night Lights

Rugby league nines competitions in the United Kingdom
Rugby league in London